Henry Grey, 2nd Earl of Tankerville, 7th Lord of Powys (1418/1419 – 13 January 1449/1450) was an English peer. He was the son of John Grey, 1st Earl of Tankerville and his wife Joan Charleton, co-heiress and 6th Lady of Powys.

Life
He became the 2nd Earl of Tankerville on 22 March 1420/1421 and was invested as a Knight in 1426.

Tankerville had Sir Gruffudd Vychan summarily executed in Powis Castle in 1447, in violation of a safe conduct given. It is not known whether he suspected Vychan of Yorkist sympathies, whether it was in retribution for the death of Sir Christopher Talbot at Sir Gruffudd's hand, or whether he wished to eliminate Vychan's claim to Powis.

Marriage and issue
He married Antigone Plantagenet, legitimized daughter of Humphrey of Lancaster, 1st Duke of Gloucester. By her he had three children:
 Richard Grey, 3rd Earl of Tankerville, married Margaret Touchet, daughter of James Touchet, 5th Baron Audley
 Humphrey Grey, married Eleanor Touchet, daughter of James Touchet, 5th Baron Audley
 Elizabeth Grey (c. 1440 – 1501?), married Sir Roger Kynaston, High Sheriff of Shropshire (c. 1430 – 1495/1517); Roger is thought to have killed Lord Audley at the Battle of Blore Heath, and they were parents of Humphrey Kynaston.

External links

1419 births
1450 deaths
Earls of Tankerville (1418 creation)